Mataveri International Airport or Isla de Pascua Airport  is at Hanga Roa on Rapa Nui / (Easter Island) (Isla de Pascua in Spanish). The runway starts just inland from the island's southeast coast at Mataveri, and nearly reaches the west coast, almost separating the mountain of Rano Kau from the rest of the island. The airport is the main point of entry for visitors to Easter Island. It  has a transit lounge that was formerly used by passengers continuing to or returning from Papeete, Tahiti, which was serviced by LATAM until June 2020.

History
Scheduled services from the Chilean mainland started in 1967 with a monthly Douglas DC-6B propliner flight operated by LAN-Chile that took nine hours, using a runway extended and paved for the use as a U.S. base. In 1970, services were upgraded with weekly Boeing 707-320 nonstop jet service to Santiago, Chile and Faa'a International Airport (PPT) in Papeete, Tahiti. Nonstop service to Papeete had been added earlier during the late 1960s using a DC-6B and the frequency then doubled to twice-weekly with LAN-Chile providing direct connecting 707 service once a week between Easter Island and Frankfurt, Paris and Madrid in Europe via its Santiago hub.  By 1975, LAN-Chile had extended its Tahiti route flown once a week with a 707 to Nadi, Fiji (NAN).  LAN-Chile then replaced its Boeing 707 flights with Boeing 767-200ER jet service and in 1993 was operating twice weekly round trip flights on a routing of Santiago (SCL) – Easter Island (IPC) – Papeete (PPT). The airline later operated Airbus A340 and Boeing 767-300ER wide body jetliners into the airport.

The airport's single runway is 3,318 m (10,885 ft) long. The airport was once designated as an abort site for the U.S. Space Shuttle when polar orbital flights from Vandenberg Air Force Base in southern California were planned with this space launch activity then subsequently being cancelled. The project undertaken by NASA to lengthen the runway was completed in 1987 and enabled wide-bodied jets to use the airport, which further boosted tourism to the island.

Description
Due to the lack of diversion airports between Tahiti and South America except for Mataveri, Chilean aviation authorities prohibit more than one aircraft from being in the vicinity of Mataveri. Once an aircraft flying from South America passes the halfway point between South America and Easter Island, no other aircraft can be closer than its own halfway point until the first aircraft successfully lands on the island. This is because if an aircraft should have an accident that obstructs or closes the runway, the other aircraft would not be able to land, and should have been turned back to its airport of departure. 

There is a hill adjacent to the eastern end of the runway. Approach and departures from either end of the runway are over the water.

Airlines and destinations

LATAM Chile operates Boeing 787 Dreamliner aircraft to the island on its scheduled services.

See also
 Extreme points of Earth
 Shuttle Down, a 1980 novel by American author G. Harry Stine (Lee Correy), which gives a fictional account of the Space Shuttle Atlantis making an emergency landing at Easter Island following launch from Vandenberg Air Force Base in California.
 Transport in Chile
 List of airports in Chile

References

External links
 Island heritage photos
 

Hanga Roa
Airports in Chile
Airports in Valparaíso Region
Buildings and structures in Easter Island
1967 establishments in Easter Island